Marianne Elliott  (born 1948) is an Irish historian who was appointed OBE in the 2000 Birthday Honours.

Career
Elliott was born on 25 May 1948 in Raholp, County Down, Northern Ireland, brought up in Belfast, and educated at Dominican College, Fortwilliam, Queen's University Belfast, and Lady Margaret Hall, Oxford.

She lectured in history at West London Institute of Higher Education 1975 to 1977, and was a Research Fellow at University College, Swansea, from 1977 to 1982. After short spells at Iowa State University and the University of South Carolina, she was a research fellow at the University of Liverpool from 1984 to 1987, and Simon Fellow at the University of Manchester from 1988 to 1989. She was a lecturer at Birkbeck, University of London, from 1991 to 1993, when she became the Andrew Geddes and John Rankin Professor of Modern History at the University of Liverpool. She was, until her retirement from the post, also the Director of the Institute of Irish Studies at the university.

She has written extensively on Irish history, receiving many awards for her work. Particularly notable publications include her biography of Wolfe Tone (1989), and more recently Catholics of Ulster: A History (2000) and a biography of Robert Emmet (2003).  Her research interests are political and cultural history, religious identities, eighteenth-century Ireland and France and the history of Ulster. 

In 2005, she delivered the Ford Lectures at Oxford University on "Religion and Identity in Irish History", which were published as When God Took Sides. Religion and Identity in Ireland : Unfinished History in 2009.

Other activities
In addition to her academic career, Elliott has played an important part in the promotion of peace efforts in Northern Ireland, notably serving on the Opsahl Commission in 1993 and co-writing its report, "A Citizens' Inquiry".

She was married to the geologist Trevor Elliott until his death in 2013.

Books
 Partners in revolution : the United Irishmen and France. New Haven : Yale University Press. 1982
 Wolfe Tone : prophet of Irish independence. New Haven : Yale University Press. 1989
 The Catholics of Ulster: a history.  London : Allen Lane The Penguin Press. 2000.
 Editor The long road to peace in Northern Ireland : peace lectures from the Institute of Irish Studies at Liverpool University. Liverpool : Liverpool University Press. 2001
 Robert Emmet : the making of a legend. London : Profile. 2003
 When God Took Sides. Religion and Identity in Ireland : Unfinished History. Oxford : Oxford University Press. 2009
Hearthlands: A memoir of the White City housing estate in Belfast Blackstaff Press 2017

Honours and awards
In 1983 Elliott received the Leo Gershoy Award of the American Historical Association.

In October 2000 she was awarded an OBE for services to Irish Studies and the Northern Ireland peace process.

In 2002 she was elected a Fellow of the British Academy. 

In 2017, Trinity College Dublin awarded her with an honorary doctorate. In the same year, she became a member of the Royal Irish Academy.

In April 2018 she was awarded a special prize by the Christopher Ewart-Biggs Memorial Prize judges "for advancing understanding of Irish history in Britain".

References

External links
 Institute of Irish Studies
 Marianne Elliott on the Ford Lectures
 Biographical notes on Marianne Elliot on the University of Liverpool website

Historians from Northern Ireland
1948 births
Living people
Iowa State University faculty
University of South Carolina faculty
Alumni of Queen's University Belfast
Alumni of Lady Margaret Hall, Oxford
Fellows of the British Academy
Academics of Birkbeck, University of London
Academics of the University of Liverpool
Members of the Royal Irish Academy
People from Newtownabbey
20th-century Irish historians
21st-century Irish historians
Irish women non-fiction writers
Officers of the Order of the British Empire
British women historians
Revisionism (Ireland)